Dimitrios Macheras (born 16 August 1990) is a Greek professional footballer who plays as a midfielder.

Club career
Macheras started his career at the youth team of Levadiakos and signed his first professional contract in June 2009. He was promoted to the first team on October of the same year and made his debut on 25 October during a victorious home game against Iraklis, coming as a substitute for Paulo Costa in the 46th minute.

Levadiakos was relegated in the Football League for the following 2010–11 season and the club's youngsters, including Machairas, were expected to play a major role in the club's fight for a Superleague return. Sure enough, Machairas made 18 appearances for Levadiakos in the 2010–11 Football League, a season which saw Levadiakos being promoted to the Superleague despite losing the promotion play-offs, thanks to the Koriopolis scandal.

International career
Macheras was called up at the Greek national under-21 football team in May 2012 for a 2013 UEFA European Under-21 Football Championship qualification match against San Marino but stayed on the bench.

References

External links
 
Onsports.gr Profile
Insports profile 

1990 births
Living people
Super League Greece players
Greek footballers
Levadiakos F.C. players
Footballers from Pyrgos, Elis
Association football midfielders